

Seeds
A champion seed is indicated in bold text while text in italics indicates the round in which that seed was eliminated.

  Brad Gilbert (quarterfinals)
  Michael Chang (quarterfinals)
  Luiz Mattar (quarterfinals)
  Dan Goldie (first round)
  Johan Kriek (second round)
  Jay Berger (champion)
  Paul Annacone (first round)
  Bruno Orešar (first round)

Draw

External links
 Singles draw

Singles